Jonas Lennart Portin (born 30 September 1986) is a Finnish former footballer who played as a defender. Portin had represented Ascoli and Padova of Serie B, the second-tier league of football in Italy.

Club career

Jaro
Portin started his senior career in Veikkausliiga team FF Jaro. He made his debut at the senior level in 2005 with FF Jaro. In 2006, he became a regular player in Jaro's starting eleven.

Ascoli
In 2009, he transferred to Serie B club Ascoli.

Padova
On 31 August 2010 he was transferred from Ascoli to Padova for €900,000 in co-ownership deal in 3-year contract. Co-currently Ascoli signed Vasco Faísca for free. and Marc Lewandowski in temporary deal.

In August 2011 Padova acquired Portin outright for €450,000; Gianluca Giovannini also moved to Ascoli for free.

Parma and retirement
In June 2012, days before the closing of the financial year of Parma on 30 June (Padova ended the financial year on 31 December), Parma signed Portin in co-ownership deal for a nominal account value of €2 million, in 3-year contract; co-currently Padova signed Niccolò Galli also in co-ownership deal for €2 million, thus a pure player exchange deal. The deal boosted both club financially as well as benefit in the field.

Portin immediately returned to Padova in temporary deal. However Portin was forced to retire from playing football on 3 August 2012 following the discovery of a rare heart defect which could have been life-threatening if he continued to play. Portin's team honoured him on 25 August 2012 by displaying his shirt after a goal against Lanciano.

Parma write-down the accounting value of Portin backdated to 2011–12 financial year, not fully but from €4 million to €2.667 million. Despite Portin was retired, along with Galli, the two co-ownership deals were renewed technically on 20 June 2013. On 30 June 2013 Portin finally released by Parma, which the club had to write down €1,777,778 on 30 June 2013 as well as bore an amortization cost of €888,889 in 2012–13 financial year. However it also counter-weight by the financial income of €2 million as Parma did not have to pay for the remain 50% registration rights. However, it was yet another financial trick as Parma suffered a €2 million loss in 2013–14, as Padova never able to buy Galli outright for another €2 million cash.

International career
Portin was also a member of Finland national under-21 football team.

Personal life
His older brother Jens is also a professional footballer, previously representing Gefle IF in Sweden.

Footnotes

References

External links
  
 
 
  
 

1986 births
Living people
Swedish-speaking Finns
Finnish footballers
Finland under-21 international footballers
Finland youth international footballers
Finnish expatriate footballers
Finnish expatriate sportspeople in Italy
Expatriate footballers in Italy
Veikkausliiga players
Serie B players
FF Jaro players
Ascoli Calcio 1898 F.C. players
Calcio Padova players
Association football defenders
People from Jakobstad
Sportspeople from Ostrobothnia (region)